Back Home is the fifth major album release from Caedmon's Call.

Track listing 

 "Only Hope" – 2:54 (Randall Goodgame, Charles Wesley)
 "You Created" – 3:27 (Joshua Moore)
 "Walk with Me" – 4:19 (Sandra McCracken)
 "Hands of the Potter" – 3:51 (Goodgame)
 "The Emptiest Day" – 3:51 (Moore, Matthew Perryman Jones)
 "The Kingdom" – 4:30 (Moore)
 "Beautiful Mystery" – 3:26 (Cliff Young, Aaron Tate, Derek Webb)
 "The High Countries" – 5:21 (McCracken)
 "Thousand Miles" – 3:21 (Aaron Senseman)
 "Never Gonna Let Go" – 3:17 (Moore, Steve Hindalong, Marc Byrd)
 "Awake My Soul" – 3:57 (McCracken)
 "Manner and Means" – 4:42 (McCracken)
 "Mystery of Mercy" – 3:12 (Goodgame, Andrew Peterson)

Personnel 

Caedmon's Call
 Cliff Young – vocals, acoustic guitar
 Derek Webb – vocals, acoustic guitar, electric guitars, banjo
 Danielle Young – vocals
 Joshua Moore – acoustic piano, keyboards, Hammond B3 organ, accordion, acoustic guitar, 12-string acoustic guitar, high-string acoustic guitar, electric guitars, dobro, mandolin, MalletKAT, backing vocals
 Jeff Miller – bass, backing vocals
 Todd Bragg – drums, percussion
 Garett Buell – drums, percussion, drum programming, MalletKAT, berimbau, cuica, tongue drum, tabla, udu

Guest musicians
 Blair Masters – string arrangements and orchestration (2, 6)
 Carl Gordetzky – conductor (2, 6)
 The Nashville String Machine – strings (2, 6)
 Sandra McCracken – backing vocals (3), acoustic guitar (12)
 Aaron Senseman – backing vocals (9)
 Paul Moak – electric guitar (10)

Production
 Caedmon's Call – producers
 Joshua Moore – producer, additional recording
 Ben Wisch – producer, recording (2-9, 11, 12), mixing (2-12)
 Robert Beeson – executive producer
 Bob Wohler – executive producer
 David Hall – recording (1, 10, 13)
 Donnie Boutwell – additional recording, assistant engineer
 Bob Boyd – additional recording, mixing (1, 13), mastering at Ambient Digital, Houston, Texas
 Bryan Graban – assistant engineer
 Greg Lawrence – assistant engineer
 Leslie Richter – assistant engineer
 Christie Bragg – production coordinator
 Michelle Pearson – production coordinator
 Tim Parker – art direction, design, photography
 David Perry – cover photography
 Ron Roark – photography
 David Dobson – photography
 Ocean Way, Nashville, Tennessee – recording location
 Emerald Masterfonics, Nashville, Tennessee – recording location
 Sixteenth Avenue Sound, Nashville, Tennessee – recording location
 Second Studios, Houston, Texas – recording location
 Joshmooreownsthis Studio, Houston, Texas – recording location
 Mixed at Red House Sound, New York City – mixing location
 Emerald Entertainment, Nashville, Tennessee – mixing location
 Ambient Digital, Houston, Texas – mixing location

Release details 

 2003, US, Essential records 83061-0694-2, Release Date February 4, 2003, CD

References 

Caedmon's Call albums
2003 albums
Essential Records (Christian) albums